Zapper: One Wicked Cricket! is a platform game for the Xbox, GameCube, PlayStation 2, Game Boy Advance, and Microsoft Windows. It was developed by Blitz Games and published by Infogrames Interactive. Zapper was released in North America in 2002 and 2003 in Europe. On November 17, 2008, Zapper became available on Xbox Live as part of the Xbox Originals range.

Plot
During a squabble over television, Zapper tries to use his brother Zipper (a grub) as a substitute TV antenna. Zipper is snatched away by an infamous thieving magpie, Maggie, who leaves an egg at the scene of the crime. Unfortunately, much to his dismay, Zapper sets off and determines to rescue his brother and turn Maggie into a jailbird. At the end of the game, Zapper gets Zipper back after defeating Maggie, and finally sets him up as a substitute TV antenna, just in time to watch TV by himself.

Gameplay
The player's aim is to traverse over eighteen levels as Zapper the cricket. Along the way the player must collect six eggs in each level. The player can jump or zap through the levels. If Zapper touches an enemy or falls into an environmental hazard, Zapper will lose his life and will respawn at the last collected egg checkpoint. Zapper has turn-based enemy movements, but the gameplay is similar to Frogger, which instead has vehicles moving independently. It is described in the GameSpot review as "basically just Frogger without the license".

Reception

The game received "mixed" reviews on all platforms according to the review aggregation website Metacritic. IGN gave the Xbox version an unfavorable review, over a month before its U.S. release.

Notes

References

External links

2002 video games
3D platform games
Game Boy Advance games
GameCube games
PlayStation 2 games
Video games about insects
Video games developed in the United Kingdom
Infogrames games
Windows games
Xbox games
Xbox Originals games

Fictional crickets
Atomic Planet Entertainment games
Single-player video games
Blitz Games Studios games